Tong Hang is a village in Fanling, North District, Hong Kong.

Administration
Tong Hang is a recognized village under the New Territories Small House Policy. It is one of the villages represented within the Fanling District Rural Committee. For electoral purposes, Tong Hang is part of the Queen's Hill constituency, which is currently represented by Law Ting-tak.

References

External links

 Delineation of area of existing village Tong Hang (Upper) (Fanling) for election of resident representative (2019 to 2022)
 Delineation of area of existing village Tong Hang (Lower) (Fanling) for election of resident representative (2019 to 2022)

Villages in North District, Hong Kong
Fanling